The 2017–18 Jackson State Tigers basketball team represented Jackson State University during the 2017–18 NCAA Division I men's basketball season. The Tigers, led by fifth-year head coach Wayne Brent, played their home games at the Williams Assembly Center in Jackson, Mississippi as members of the Southwestern Athletic Conference. They finished the season 12–20, 9–9 in SWAC play to finish in sixth place. Due to Grambling State's ineligibility, they received the No. 5 seed in the SWAC tournament where they lost to Southern in the quarterfinals.

Previous season
The Tigers finished the 2016–17 season 14–18, 10–8 in SWAC play to finish in a four-way tie for third place. As the No. 6 seed in the SWAC tournament, they lost to Southern in the quarterfinals.

Roster

Schedule and results

|-
!colspan=9 style=| Non-conference regular season

|-
!colspan=9 style=| SWAC regular season

|-
!colspan=9 style=| SWAC tournament

References

Jackson State Tigers basketball seasons
Jackson State